The Joback method (often named Joback/Reid method) predicts eleven important and commonly used pure component thermodynamic properties from molecular structure only.

Basic principles

Group-contribution method  

The Joback method is a group-contribution method. These kinds of methods use basic structural information of a chemical molecule, like a list of simple functional groups, add parameters to these functional groups, and calculate thermophysical and transport properties as a function of the sum of group parameters. 

Joback assumes that there are no interactions between the groups, and therefore only uses additive contributions and no contributions for interactions between groups. Other group-contribution methods, especially methods like UNIFAC, which estimate mixture properties like activity coefficients, use both simple additive group parameters and group-interaction parameters. The big advantage of using only simple group parameters is the small number of needed parameters. The number of needed group-interaction parameters gets very high for an increasing number of groups (1 for two groups, 3 for three groups, 6 for four groups, 45 for ten groups and twice as much if the interactions are not symmetric).

Nine of the properties are single temperature-independent values, mostly estimated by a simple sum of group contribution plus an addend.
Two of the estimated properties are temperature-dependent: the ideal-gas heat capacity and the dynamic viscosity of liquids. The heat-capacity polynomial uses 4 parameters, and the viscosity equation only 2. In both cases the equation parameters are calculated by group contributions.

History 

The Joback method is an extension of the Lydersen method and uses very similar groups, formulas, and parameters for the three properties the Lydersen already supported (critical temperature, critical pressure, critical volume). 

Joback extended the range of supported properties, created new parameters and modified slightly the formulas of the old Lydersen method.

Model strengths and weaknesses

Strengths

The popularity and success of the Joback method mainly originates from the single group list for all properties. This allows one to get all eleven supported properties from a single analysis of the molecular structure. 

The Joback method additionally uses a very simple and easy to assign group scheme, which makes the method usable for people with only basic chemical knowledge.

Weaknesses

Newer developments of estimation methods have shown that the quality of the Joback method is limited. The original authors already stated themselves in the original article abstract: "High accuracy is not claimed, but the proposed methods are often as or more accurate than techniques in common use today."  

The list of groups does not cover many common molecules sufficiently. Especially aromatic compounds are not differentiated from normal ring-containing components. This is a severe problem because aromatic and aliphatic components differ strongly.

The data base Joback and Reid used for obtaining the group parameters was rather small and covered only a limited number of different molecules. The best coverage has been achieved for normal boiling points (438 components), and the worst for heats of fusion (155 components). Current developments that can use data banks, like the Dortmund Data Bank or the DIPPR data base, have a much broader coverage.

The formula used for the prediction of the normal boiling point shows another problem. Joback assumed a constant contribution of added groups in homologous series like the alkanes. This doesn't describe the real behavior of the normal boiling points correctly. Instead of the constant contribution, a decrease of the contribution with increasing number of groups must be applied. The chosen formula of the Joback method leads to high deviations for large and small molecules and an acceptable good estimation only for mid-sized components.

Formulas 
In the following formulas Gi denotes a group contribution. Gi are counted for every single available group. If a group is present multiple times, each occurrence is counted separately.

Normal boiling point

Melting point

Critical temperature

This critical-temperature equation needs a normal boiling point Tb. If an experimental value is available, it is recommended to use this boiling point. It is, on the other hand, also possible to input the normal boiling point estimated by the Joback method. This will lead to a higher error.

Critical pressure

where Na is the number of atoms in the molecular structure (including hydrogens).

Critical volume

Heat of formation (ideal gas, 298 K)

Gibbs energy of formation (ideal gas, 298 K)

Heat capacity (ideal gas)

The Joback method uses a four-parameter polynomial to describe the temperature dependency of the ideal-gas heat capacity. These parameters are valid from 273 K to about 1000 K. But you are able to extend it to 1500K if you don't mind a bit of uncertainty here and there.

Heat of vaporization at normal boiling point

Heat of fusion

Liquid dynamic viscosity

where Mw is the molecular weight.

The method uses a two-parameter equation to describe the temperature dependency of the dynamic viscosity. The authors state that the parameters are valid from the melting temperature up to 0.7 of the critical temperature (Tr < 0.7).

Group contributions

Example calculation 

Acetone (propanone) is the simplest ketone and is separated into three groups in the Joback method: two methyl groups (−CH3) and one ketone group (C=O). Since the methyl group is present twice, its contributions have to be added twice.

References

External links 

 Online molecular drawing and property estimation tool with the Joback method
 Online property estimation with the Joback method

Physical chemistry
Thermodynamic models